Robert Charles Chambers (born August 27, 1952) is a United States district judge of the United States District Court for the Southern District of West Virginia.

Education and career

Born in Williamson, West Virginia, Chambers received an Artium Baccalaureus degree from Marshall University in 1974, and a Juris Doctor from West Virginia University College of Law in 1977. He was in private practice in Charleston, West Virginia from 1977 to 1997, and was legal counsel to the West Virginia State Senate in 1978. He was also a Delegate to the West Virginia House of Delegates from 1978 to 1996 and Speaker from 1986 to 1996.

Federal judicial service

On June 5, 1997, Chambers was nominated by President Bill Clinton to a seat on the United States District Court for the Southern District of West Virginia vacated by Elizabeth Virginia Hallanan. He was confirmed by the United States Senate on September 5, 1997, and received his commission on September 18, 1997. He served as Chief Judge from 2012 to 2017.

References

Sources

1952 births
20th-century American lawyers
Living people
Speakers of the West Virginia House of Delegates
Democratic Party members of the West Virginia House of Delegates
Judges of the United States District Court for the Southern District of West Virginia
United States district court judges appointed by Bill Clinton
People from Williamson, West Virginia
Marshall University alumni
West Virginia University College of Law alumni
West Virginia lawyers
Lawyers from Charleston, West Virginia
20th-century American judges
21st-century American judges